Percocypris regani is a species of cyprinid in the genus Percocypris. It inhabits China.

The fish is named in honor of ichthyologist Charles Tate Regan (1878-1943) of the Natural History Museum in London, who among his many interests he studied the fishes of Yunnan, China.

References

Kottelat, M., 2001. Freshwater fishes of northern Vietnam. A preliminary check-list of the fishes known or expected to occur in northern Vietnam with comments on systematics and nomenclature. Environment and Social Development Unit, East Asia and Pacific Region. The World Bank. 123 p.

Cyprinidae
Cyprinid fish of Asia
Freshwater fish of China
Taxa named by Tchang Tchung-Lin
Fish described in 1935